Paradise is an unincorporated community and census-designated place (CDP) that is the southernmost community in Mono County, California, United States.  The population was 174 at the 2020 census.

Geography
Located in the southwest part of the county, Paradise functions as a bedroom community for workers in Bishop ( to the southeast) and Mammoth Lakes ( to the northwest), and as a home for retirees. Geographically, it sits near the bottom of the Sherwin Grade, which divides Round Valley in Inyo County from Long Valley in Mono County.  Neighboring communities include Wheeler Crest to the west, Swall Meadows and Pinon Ranch to the north.

Demographics

2010
The 2010 United States Census reported that Paradise had a population of 153. The racial makeup of Paradise was 130 (85.0%) White, 0 (0.0%) African American, 2 (1.3%) Native American, 6 (3.9%) Asian, 0 (0.0%) Pacific Islander, 5 (3.3%) from other races, and 10 (6.5%) from two or more races. Hispanic or Latino of any race were 14 persons (9.2%).

The Census reported that 153 people (100% of the population) lived in households, 0 (0%) lived in non-institutionalized group quarters, and 0 (0%) were institutionalized.

There were 74 households, out of which 11 (14.9%) had children under the age of 18 living in them, 49 (66.2%) were opposite-sex married couples living together, 2 (2.7%) had a female householder with no husband present, 0 (0%) had a male householder with no wife present.  There were 2 (2.7%) unmarried opposite-sex partnerships, and 1 (1.4%) same-sex married couples or partnerships. 20 households (27.0%) were made up of individuals, and 10 (13.5%) had someone living alone who was 65 years of age or older. The average household size was 2.07.  There were 51 families (68.9% of all households); the average family size was 2.47.

The population was spread out, with 19 people (12.4%) under the age of 18, 2 people (1.3%) aged 18 to 24, 23 people (15.0%) aged 25 to 44, 76 people (49.7%) aged 45 to 64, and 33 people (21.6%) who were 65 years of age or older.  The median age was 52.9 years. For every 100 females, there were 104.0 males.  For every 100 females age 18 and over, there were 97.1 males.

There were 87 housing units at an average density of 20.0 per square mile (7.7/km), of which 71 (95.9%) were owner-occupied, and 3 (4.1%) were occupied by renters. The homeowner vacancy rate was 1.4%; the rental vacancy rate was 25.0%.  149 people (97.4% of the population) lived in owner-occupied housing units and 4 people (2.6%) lived in rental housing units.

2000
The 2000 United States Census reported the population of Paradise to be 124. For 2003, the California Department of Finance estimated the population to be 126.  In 2000, 2% of the population was under 5 years old, 6% were from 5 to 17, 64% were from 18 to 64, and 28% were over 65. The median age was 57. Paradise's percentage of seniors and median age both exceeded the county averages. Eighty-six percent of the households were owner occupied and 14% were rented. Sixty percent of Paradise's 132 lots have been developed, and there are current plans to 53 luxury homes on one undeveloped parcel.

Tourism
There is a commercial tourist industry in Paradise. The Paradise Lodge is a designated rural resort that contains 17 cabins and a restaurant.

Fire Protection District
Paradise is the seat of the Paradise Fire Protection District, which was established in 1982.

References

Census-designated places in Mono County, California
Census-designated places in California